Cuneisigna obstans is a moth of the family Noctuidae first described by Francis Walker in 1858. It is found in Mozambique and South Africa.

References

Catocalinae
Lepidoptera of Mozambique
Lepidoptera of South Africa
Lepidoptera of Tanzania
Moths of Sub-Saharan Africa